The Malta men's national under-16 basketball team is a national basketball team of Malta, administered by the Malta Basketball Association. It represents the country in international men's under-16 basketball competitions.

The team won three medals at the U16 European Championship Division C.

FIBA U16 European Championship participations

See also
Malta men's national basketball team
Malta men's national under-18 basketball team
Malta women's national under-16 basketball team

References

External links
Archived records of Malta team participations

Basketball in Malta
Basketball
Men's national under-16 basketball teams